The Canadian weather radar network consists of 33 weather radars spanning Canada's most populated regions. Their primary purpose is the early detection of precipitation, its motion and the threat it poses to life and property.

Furthermore, the new radars are dual-polarized which means precipitation type can be estimated directly. The range extensions are intended to provide forecasters at the Meteorological Service of Canada, part of Environment and Climate Change Canada, with radar information while nearby radars are being replaced as part of the renewal. Starting on 29 June 2022, a pilot project allow external users access to the raw data, possibly including the 400 km data.

History
Research in weather radars in Canada began at the end of the Second World War with "Project Stormy Weather". After the war, J.S. Marshall continued at McGill University the work with the "Stormy Weather Group". The Canadian network was thus gradually formed and by 1997, there were 19 weather radars of two kinds across the country: 18 five centimeter wavelength (C-Band) radars and 1 ten centimeter wavelength (S-Band) at McGill, all of the radars detected reflectivity but only Carvel (Edmonton), King City (Toronto) and McGill (Montreal) were equipped with Doppler capabilities.

Environment Canada received approval in 1998 to upgrade the network to Doppler standard and to add 12 more radars with the operational characteristics coming from King City weather radar station (CWKR), the research radar of Environment Canada. However, the McGill radar (at the J. S. Marshall Radar Observatory), while being part of the network, was owned by McGill University. It was a research as well as an operational radar and was modified independently. The Jimmy Lake and Lac Castor stations are owned and operated by the Department of Defense (DND), these are also part of the network.

In February 2017, the Minister of Environment and Climate Change, Catherine McKenna, announced the signature of a  $83‑million contract with Selex ES (ex-subsidiary of Leonardo S.p.A. now marketed under Leonardo Electronics) to buy 20 new radars with the most modern technology available (S band and double polarized) to update the network.  with the contract containing options to replace all radars in the Canadian Weather Radar Network, by March 31, 2023. The first radar was installed in Radisson, SK in the fall of 2017. The second radar was installed in the summer of 2018 at Blainville in the Montreal region to replace the aging McGill radar (WMN).  2018 also saw replacement radars at Foxwarren MB, Timmins ON ( near Smooth Rock Falls), and Spirit River AB and 19 of the new radars were in place by the end of 2020 with the rest being replaced sequentially by 2023. An additional radar will be installed in the Lower Athabasca region in Alberta. Such areas include the Edmonton area and the southwestern region of Newfoundland.

Characteristics before 2018
 McGill radar (at the J. S. Marshall Radar Observatory):
 9 metre (30 feet) diameter antenna.
 Uses a klystron to produce a wavelength signal of 10 cm. (S-Band)
 Doppler since 1993 and dual polarization was added in 1999.
 King City weather radar station 
 This research radar is essentially a WSR-98A (see below) upgraded with dual polarization capability in 2004.
The rest of the network:
 The existing radars have antennas from two manufacturers: Enterprise Electronics Corporation (EEC) and Raytheon.
 some of the existing radars have antennas produced by Andrew Canada. With a diameter almost double the old ones; resolutions improved by the same amount.
 Use 5.6 cm wavelength emitting magnetrons. (C-Band)
 Process received reflectivity and Doppler data with Sigmet Radar Data Systems, now a part of Vaisala Oyj.
 Each radar in the network will thus be called a WSR-98E, WSR-98R or WSR-98A for Weather Surveillance Radar - 1998 (for the year of the start of the program) and the first letter of the manufacturer of the Pedestal/Antenna (Enterprise, Raytheon or Andrew).
 Antennas of 3.6 metres in diameter for the pre-1998 vintage radars and 6.1 m for the new ones.
 Pulse length and pulse repetition frequency adjustable. Pulse length 0.8,1.6 and 2.0s. Pulse repetition frequency (PRF) 250 Hz and Dual PRF (Doppler Mode) 1190/1200 Hz.

Scanning strategy
Because the network is using C band radars, compromises had to be used (see Doppler dilemma) between maximum reflectivity range and maximum non ambiguous velocities. The actual scanning strategy (2006) is divided in two separate scans over 10 minutes:
 Conventional cycle: 24 elevation angles scanned in 5 minutes to obtain a tri-dimensional view of the atmosphere within 256 km of the radar in reflectivity.
 Doppler cycle: 4 angles scanned in reflectivity and velocities, the first three in a range of 128 km and the last within 256 km. This cycle is used to locate possible small scale rotation and shear in the wind pattern as well as the large scale circulation. The velocity data also help to filter artifacts in the reflectivity such as ground echos.

The McGill radar uses a S-band transmitter instead of a C-band transmitter to acquire reflectivities and velocities during each of its 24 elevation angles with the same 5 minute cycle time.

Modernization project
Environment and Climate Change Canada received the funding from the Treasury Board in 2011 to undergo a major modernization project called 'WES (Weather and Environmental Services) Renewal' to upgrade to dual polarization all Canadian Radars in two separate five year plans. Complete network stabilization and systemic problems resolution were also part of this major effort by Environment and Climate Change Canada. The first five years concentrated on the upgrading and stabilizing of the existing radars. Then all Canadian weather radars will be replaced with a dual polarization S-band radar between 2017 and 2023. A new radar, owned and operated by ECCC,  has been installed in Blainville (near Montreal) to replace the use of the McGill radar.  As well, a new radar will be installed in the Lower Athabasca area.

The new radars are the Leonardo METEOR 1700S (formerly marketed by Selex ES) which is fully Doppler and dual polarized:
 Transmitter type: Klystron
 Frequency : 2.7 - 2.9 GHz
 Pulse repetition frequency (PRF): 	250 – 2000 Hz
 Pulse length (τ): 	0.4 µs ... 4.5 µs
 Peak power: 	750 kW
 Doppler range: 240 km
 Reflectivity normal range: 300 km
 maximum range: 600 km
 Velocity resolution : ± 146 m/s
 Antenna diameter: 8.5 m
 Beamwidth : 	< 1°
 Rotation: 	6 min−1

These new S-Band radars offer more flexibility over the previous C-Band radars. The scanning strategy of 17 angles scanned in 6 minutes, and the new dual-polarization feature provide:

 Dual polarization will permit to better differentiate the type of precipitation (rain, snow, hail and freezing rain), biological and non-biological targets such as birds, insects, chaff, and tornado debris signature.

Starting on June 15, 2021, some of the S-band radars have a modification of the scanning strategy : a low level angle of 0.3 degree will use a low PRF to extend its range to 400 km in reflectivity while a mid-level angle will be eliminated in the cycle in order to help in radar coverage.

List of radars

The first modernization process began in the fall of 1998 with the opening of Bethune radar and ended in 2004 with the one in Timmins. The replacement of C-band 250 kW Magnetron single-pol radars with S-band 1MW Klystron dual-pol radars began in 2017 and will end in 2023.

See also

Related article
 NEXRAD, the weather radar network in United States
 List of Bureau of Meteorology weather radars in Australia

Bibliography

References

External links

 
 ECCC weather radar data public documentation
 ECCC North-American weather radar composite available as a WMS web service
 ECCC weather radar data and products file repository
 
 
 

Meteorological Service of Canada
Weather radars
Weather radar networks